The Jawa 350 is a motorcycle, produced by Jawa Moto in Czechoslovakia since the 1930s until 1992 and in the Czech Republic until present.

The Jawa 350 remains popular thanks to its dominance of the Communist Bloc countries of Eastern Europe from the 1960s to the 1990s. Competitors of that time included the German MZ (250 cc) and Simson (250 cc Sport & Awo), the Hungarian Pannonia (250 cc), the Polish Junak (350 cc) and the Soviet IZh (350 cc). This was a period before the penetration of Eastern Europe by Japanese motorcycle manufacturers. In the early nineties was made additional model line Jawa 350 type 640.

The Jawa 350 two stroke twin cylinder motorcycle is still in production, although its styling and design has changed over the years, it is almost mechanically unchanged since the 1970s. It is imported and sold in the UK where the two 350cc two stroke models are named the "Classic" and the "Sport". 2012 UK models are equipped with electronic ignition, electric starters and automatic pumped oil injection. They are also imported and sold in Ireland and are distributed throughout Europe.

Jawa 350 was the first foreign motorcycle, available for sale in post-WWII USSR. The other only manufactures (until 1991) were ČZ (Chezet) and Hungarian Pannónia.

The 350/640 two-stroke twin is almost mechanically unchanged since the 1970s, it is still successfully sold mainly to the countries of Latin America.

Because the Jawa 350 OHC meets the  EURO V standards, it can be (unlike aged Jawa 350/640) sold in the European Union.

Versions 

1934–1936: Jawa 350 SV - four-stroke single-cylinder motorcycle
1935–1946: Jawa 350 OHV - successor to 350 SV
1948–1956: Jawa 350 Pérák - two-stroke twin-cylinder
1954–1964: Jawa 350/354 - two-stroke twin-cylinder
1964–1974: Jawa 350/360 Automatic - two-stroke single-cylinder, with first automatic clutch in the world
1965–1969: Jawa 350/361 Sport - two-stroke twin-cylinder with larger 19“ wheels
1967–1973: Jawa 350/362 Californian - two-stroke twin-cylinder
1990-1992: Jawa 350-632 - two-stroke twin-cylinder 12 Volt alternator equipped slower version of 634 model in the style of the Jawa 350-638. Two variants.
1970–1972: Jawa 350/633 Bizon - two-stroke twin-cylinder
1973–1985: Jawa 350/634 - two-stroke twin-cylinder
1986–1994: Jawa 350/638 - two-stroke twin-cylinder (1986 model 34 HP @ 6,500 RPM / restricted to 25 HP @ 5,500 RPM after 1987 by baffle and piston redesign).
1984–1994: Jawa 350/639 - two-stroke twin-cylinder with front disc brake
Since 1991: Jawa 350/640 - two-stroke twin-cylinder, in Style or Retro variations
Since 2017: Jawa 350 OHC - four-stroke single-cylinder, fulfilling Euro 4-5

Images

Jawa 350 OHC 

The Jawa 350 OHC has been manufactured since 2017, based on the Jawa 350/634 motorcycle from the 1970s. Unlike all previous Jawa 350 motorcycles, which were two-stroke twin-cylinder, this is a four-stroke single-cylinder. For the first time in Jawa history, this model is also equipped with ABS brake assist.

The design from the Jawa 350 OHC Special variant is inspired by the racing motorcycle Jawa 350/673 (a special, built in three pieces in 1967). It adopts a Café racer design. The third version Jawa 350 OHC Scrambler improves the off-road capabilities of the motorcycle, fuel tank is remainding the Jawa 250/353 (Kývačka).

All versions of the Jawa 350 OHC line-up are entirely based on the Chinese-Made Shineray XY400 in its respective Naked, Scrambler and Café Racer variants.

Specifications 
 Motor: air-cooled four-stroke single-cylinder with Delphi electronic injection
 Displacement: 397 cm3
 Max power: 20.4 kW @ 6500 ot./min
 Max. torque: 30.6 Nm @ 5000 ot./min
 Emission standards: Euro 4
 Wheelbase: 1420 mm
 Transmission: manual five-speed
 Wheels: Front 19", Rear 18"
 Tyres: Front 100/90/19, Rear 130/70/18
 Brakes: rear drum 160 mm, front disc 280 mm with ABS
 Dry weight: 160 kg
 Max. speed: 130 km/h
 Fuel consumption: 3.2 L/100 km

See also
Jawa 250

References 

350
Sport bikes